Jeffrey Robert Morris (born February 24, 1964) is an American politician who served as a member of the Washington House of Representatives, representing the 40th district from 1997 to 2020. A member of the Democratic Party, Morris was one of three self-identified American Indians, along with John McCoy (Tulalip Tribes) and Jay Rodne (Bad River Band of Chippewa), in the Washington State Legislature.

Early life and education
Jeff Morris is a fourth-generation native of Guemes Island. He also lived in Anacortes, Washington, where he graduated Anacortes High School in 1982. He graduated from Central Washington University.

Career
Based in Anacortes, Morris became active in the Democratic Party and successfully ran for the state House of Representatives in 1996 to represent the 40th Legislative District. Repeatedly re-elected, he served as chairman of the Technology and Economic Development Committee and is also a member of the Environment and Transportation committees. He has previously served as speaker pro tempore, House floor leader, and chairman of the Finance and Technology, Energy, and Communications committees.

Morris served on the executive committee of the National Conference of State Legislatures and is the past chairman of the Council of State Governments-West and past president of the Pacific Northwest Economic Region.

He retired mid-term in 2020 to take a job in the private sector, and activist Alex Ramel was appointed to serve for the remainder of his term.

References

External links
 Legislative biography

1964 births
Living people
20th-century American politicians
21st-century American politicians
20th-century Native Americans
21st-century Native Americans
Central Washington University alumni
Democratic Party members of the Washington House of Representatives
Native American state legislators in Washington (state)
People from Anacortes, Washington
People from Mount Vernon, Washington
Tsimshian people